Ekaterina Aleksandrovna Vasilieva (born May 30, 1976 in Moscow) is a Russian water polo player, who won the bronze medal at the 2000 Summer Olympics.Now she plays in Rari Nantes Bologna.

See also
 List of Olympic medalists in water polo (women)

External links
 
profile

1976 births
Living people
Russian female water polo players
Olympic water polo players of Russia
Water polo players at the 2000 Summer Olympics
Water polo players at the 2004 Summer Olympics
Olympic bronze medalists for Russia
Olympic medalists in water polo
Sportspeople from Moscow
Medalists at the 2000 Summer Olympics
21st-century Russian women